Janez Peternel (26 December 1913 – 30 November 1943) was a Yugoslav cyclist, who rode for Hermes Ljubljana. He won Tour of Serbia in 1940. He died as partisan in World War II.

References
Gimnazija Škofja Loka : 50 let / [zbral in uredil Marjan Luževič ; ilustracije Maja Šubic]. - Škofja Loka : Gimnazija, 2000

1913 births
Yugoslav male cyclists
Sportspeople from Ljubljana
Slovenian male cyclists
1943 deaths
Yugoslav Partisans members
Resistance members killed by Nazi Germany